Ibrahim Kazaure (born 12 November 1954) was a Nigerian senator in the Nigerian Third Republic and Nigerian Ambassador to the Kingdom of Saudi Arabia who was briefly Federal Minister of Labour and Productivity in 2010.

Early life and education 
Kazaure was born in Jigawa State on 12 November 1954, and gained a national diploma in building and civil engineering.

Political career 
He became the Commissioner for Education in Kano State in 1983. He was elected to the Senate in the Nigerian Third Republic, serving as the Majority Whip. He was the Nigerian Ambassador to Saudi Arabia between 2003 and 2007.

He was appointed as the Minister of Special Duties by president Umaru Yar'Adua in December 2008. He was appointed Minister of Labour and Productivity on 10 February 2010, when acting president Goodluck Jonathan moved Adetokunbo Kayode to the Ministry of Justice. He left office on 17 March 2010 when acting president Goodluck Jonathan dissolved his cabinet.

References

Living people
1954 births
People from Jigawa State
Federal ministers of Nigeria
Ambassadors of Nigeria to Saudi Arabia